This is a list of state parks and reserves in the Virginia state park system.

The six original state parks were Seashore State Park (now First Landing State Park), Westmoreland State Park, Staunton River State Park, Douthat State Park, Fairy Stone State Park, and Hungry Mother State Park. The park system now oversees 43 parks.

State parks

See also
List of national parks of the United States
List of Virginia state forests
List of Virginia Natural Area Preserves
List of Virginia Wildlife Management Areas

References

External links
 Virginia State Parks

 
Virginia
State parks
Virginia Department of Conservation and Recreation
Protected areas of Virginia